This is a list of countries by motor vehicle production based on Organisation Internationale des Constructeurs d'Automobiles (OICA) and other data from 2016 and earlier.Figures include passenger cars, light commercial vehicles, minibuses, trucks, buses and coaches.

By total production 

EX denotes that the country's motor vehicle production rank is unknown.

By produced vehicles per 1,000 people

See also
List of countries by motor vehicle production in the 2000s
List of countries by motor vehicle production in the 2010s
List of manufacturers by motor vehicle production
Automotive industry by country
List of countries by vehicles per capita
Automotive industry

References and notes

External links
 

Motor vehicle